The Guêpe-class submarines were a planned class of submarines to be built for the French Navy ordered in 1904. Ten of the class were projected but only two were laid down before the whole project was cancelled. Construction of the two vessels that were laid down began in 1906, but it was stopped in 1908 before they could be completed.

Construction and specifications
The Guêpe-class submarines, designed by Emmanuel Petithomme and built under French Minister of Marine Camille Pelletan's ministry, were solely intended for use in harbor defense. Although ten were projected, only two of the class were laid down in Cherbourg. Neither of these were completed before Camille Pelletan was replaced as Minister of Marine and his successor cancelled their construction. The class-name, "guêpe", is French for wasp.

If built, the Guêpe submarines would have been powered by one Schneider diesel engine driving a single shaft, which would have provided a top speed of  when surfaced and  when submerged. The vessels' armament would have consisted solely of two  Drzewiecki drop collar torpedo launchers.

Boats 
Ordered in 1904, Guêpe 1 and Guêpe 2 were laid down in 1906 at the Cherbourg Naval Base. Eight more boats, Guêpe 3 to 10, were planned to be built in Cherbourg, Rochefort, and Brest. Only the first two submarines were ordered on 8 October 1904 and laid down. Construction stopped in March 1908. The pennant numbers  Q 51 to 58, reserved for Guêpe 3 to Guêpe 10, were assigned the following year to Pluviôse-class submarines.

See also 
List of submarines of France

References

Citations

 

Submarines of the French Navy
Submarine classes
Ship classes of the French Navy